Festival panafricain d’Alger 1969 is a 1969 documentary film.

Synopsis 
Algiers Pan-African Festival is a documentary shot in 1969 during the first edition of the Festival. William Klein follows the preparations of this "Opera from the Third World", the rehearsals, and the concerts. He blends images of interviews made with writers and advocates of the freedom movements with stock images, thus allowing him to touch on such matters as colonialism, neocolonialism, colonial exploitation, the struggles and battles of the revolutionary movements for independence, and African culture.

External links
 

Creative Commons-licensed documentary films
Algerian documentary films
French documentary films
German documentary films
West German films
1969 documentary films
1969 films
Documentary films about African resistance to colonialism
Films directed by William Klein
1960s French films
1960s German films